The dean of the College of Cardinals presides over the College of Cardinals in the Roman Catholic Church, serving as primus inter pares (first among equals). The position was established in the 12th century. He always holds the rank of a cardinal bishop, and is assisted by a vice-dean. Both are elected by and from the cardinal bishops who are not Eastern Catholic patriarchs, with their election subject to papal confirmation. Except for presiding over the college, the dean and vice-dean have no power over the other cardinals. In the order of precedence in the Catholic Church, the dean and vice-dean, as the two most senior cardinals, are placed second and third, respectively, after the pope.

It had been customary for centuries for the longest-serving of the six cardinal bishops of suburbicarian sees to be the dean. This was required by canon law from 1917 until 1965, when Pope Paul VI empowered the six to elect the dean from among their number. This election was a formality until the time of Pope John Paul II.

In 2019, upon accepting Cardinal Angelo Sodano's resignation as dean of the College of Cardinals, Pope Francis established that the dean would henceforth serve a five-year term that may be renewed once. Sodano received the title "dean emeritus" upon resigning on 21 December 2019. In anticipation of the election of Sodano's successor, Francis said: "I am hoping they will elect someone who can carry this important responsibility full time." Previously, the dean held the position until death or resignation; there was no mandatory age of retirement.

Responsibilities

The dean summons the conclave for the purposes of electing a new pope following a death or resignation. The Dean presides over the daily meetings of the College of Cardinals in advance of the conclave and then presides over the conclave if his age does not prohibit his participation. The dean also has the responsibility of communicating the "news of the Pope's death to the Diplomatic Corps accredited to the Holy See and to the Heads of the respective Nations". He is the public face of the Holy See until a new pope is elected. If he participates in the conclave, the dean asks the pope-elect if he accepts the election, and then asks the new pope what name he wishes to use. If the dean himself is elected pope, the afore mentioned tasks are assumed by the sub-dean of the College of Cardinals. If the newly elected pope is not already a bishop, the dean ordains him a bishop.

The dean has "the title of the diocese of Ostia, together with that of any other church to which he already has a title," such as his suburbicarian diocese. This has been the case since 1914, by decree of Pope Pius X—previous deans had given up their suburbicarian see and taken the joint title of Ostia and Velletri, which were separated in that same 1914 decree.

Deans elected pope
Nine Deans have been elected pope: 
Corrado Demitri, elected in 1153 as Pope Anastasius IV
Ubaldo Allucingoli, elected Pope Lucius III in 1181
Ugolino di Conti was elected Pope Gregory IX in 1227 
Rinaldo di Conti was elected Pope Alexander IV in 1254
Pedro Julião was elected Pope John XXI in September 1276
Rodrigo Borgia was elected Pope Alexander VI in 1492 
Alessandro Farnese was elected Pope Paul III in 1534
Gian Pietro Carafa was elected Pope Paul IV in May 1555
Joseph Ratzinger was elected Pope Benedict XVI in 2005

List of deans

The following is the list of deans of the Sacred College of Cardinals, separated into three groups to account for the Western Schism, which  ended after the Council of Constance. The earliest attested reference to the "College of Cardinals" is at the Council of Reims in 1148.

Each name in the following list includes years of birth and death, then comma-separated years of cardinalate and deanship.

Before the Western Schism

12th century
Pietro Senex (d. 1134) (1102, before 1130)
Guillaume (d. 1137/39) (1122, 1130)
Corrado della Suburra (1073–1154) (1114, 1137/39) Elected Pope Anastasius IV in 1153
Imar of Tusculum (d. 1161) (1142, 1153, deposed 1159)
Gregorio de Suburra (d. 1163) (1140, 1159)
Ubaldo Allucingoli (1097–1185) (1138, 1163)  Elected Pope Lucius III in 1181
Conrad of Wittelsbach (1120/25–1200) (1165, 1181)

13th Century
Ottaviano di Paoli (d. 1206) (1182, 1200)
Pietro Gallocia (d. 1211) (1188, 1206)
Nicola de Romanis (d. 1219) (1204, 1211)
Ugolino dei Conti di Segni (1145–1241) (1198, 1219) Elected Pope Gregory IX in 1227
Pelagio Galvani (d. 1230) (1206/07, 1227)
Jean Halgrin (1180–1237) (1227, 1230)
Jacques de Vitry (1160/70–1240) (1228, 1237)
Rinaldo Conti (1185–1261) (1227, 1240) Elected Pope Alexander IV in 1254
Odo of Châteauroux (1190–1273) (1244, 1254)
John of Toledo (d. 1275) (1244, 1273)
João Pedro Julião (1210–1276) (1273, 1275)  Elected Pope John XXI in 1276)
Bertrand de Saint-Martin (d. 1277) (1273, 1276)
Ordonho Alvares (1198–1285) (1278, 1278)
Bentivenga dei Bentivenghi (1230–1289) (1278, 1285)
Latino Malabranca Orsini (d. 1294) (1278, 1289)
Gerardo Bianchi (1220/25–1302) (1278, 1294)

14th Century
Giovanni Boccamazza (d. 1309) (1285, 1302)
Leonardo Patrasso (1230–1311) (1300, 1309)
Giovanni Minio de Murovalle (1250–1312) (1302, 1311)
Nicolò Albertini (1250–1321) (1303, 1312)
Berengar Fredol the Elder (1250–1323) (1305, 1321)
Berengar Fredol the Younger (d. 1323) (1312, 1323)
Guillaume Godin (1260–1336) (1312, 1323)
Pierre Desprès (1288–1361) (1320, 1336)
Élie de Talleyrand-Périgord (1301–1364) (1331, 1361)
Guy de Boulogne (1313–1373) (1342, 1364)
Ange de Grimoard (1315/20-1388) (1366, 1373, deposed by Urban VI in 1378, retained the post in the obedience of Avignon until 1388)

During the Western Schism

The obedience of Rome (1378–1415)
Tommaso da Frignano (1305–1381) (1378)
Francesco Moricotti Prignano (d. 1394) (1378, 1381)
Philippe d'Alençon (1338–1397) (1378, 1394)
Pietro Pileo di Prata (1330–1400) (1378, 1397)
Angelo Acciaioli (1349–1408) (1384, 1405)
Enrico Minutoli (d. 1412) (1389, 1408 until 1409)
Antonio Correr (1369–1445) (1408, 1409 until 1415)

The obedience of Avignon (1378–1429)
Ange de Grimoard (until 1388)
Pietro Corsini (1335–1405) (1370, 1388)
Gui de Malsec (d. 1412) (1375, 1405, deposed 1409, retained the post in the obedience of Pisa)
Jean Flandrin (after 1301–1415) (1390, 1405)
Julián Lobera y Valtierra (d. 1435) (1423, 1423 until 1429)

The obedience of Pisa (1409–1415)
Gui de Malsec (until 1412)
Jean Allarmet de Brogny (1342–1426) (1385, 1412 until 1415)

After the Council of Constance

15th Century
Angelo Correr (ca.1330–1417) (1415, 1415)
Jean-Allarmet de Brogny (1342–1426) (1385, 1417)
Baldassare Cossa (ca.1360/70–1419) (1419, 1419)
Jean Allarmet de Brogny (2rd term) (1342–1426) (1385, 1419)
Angelo d'Anna de Sommariva (d. 1428) (1384, 1426)
Giordano Orsini (1360/70–1438) (1405, 1428)
Antonio Correr (again) (1369–1445) (1408, 1438)
Giovanni Berardi (1380–1449) (1439, 1445)
Amadeo de Savoy (1383–1451) (1449, 1449)
Francesco Condulmer (1390–1453) (1431, 1451)
Giorgio Fieschi (ca.1395–1461) (1439, 1453)
Isidore of Kiev (1380/90–1463) (1439, 1461)
Bessarion (1403–1472) (1439, 1463)
Guillaume d'Estouteville (1403–1483) (1439, 1472)
Rodrigo Borgia (1431–1503) (1456, 1483) Elected Pope Alexander VI in 1492)
Oliviero Carafa (1430–1511) (1467, 1492)

16th Century
Raffaele Riario (1461–1521) (1477, 1511)
Bernardino Lopez de Carvajal (1456–1523) (1493, 1521)
Francesco Soderini (1453–1524) (1503, 1523)
Niccolò Fieschi (1456–1524) (1503, 1524)
Alessandro Farnese (1468–1549) (1493, 1524)Elected Pope Paul III in 1534)
Giovanni Piccolomini (1475–1537) (1517, 1535)
Giovanni Domenico de Cupis (1493–1553) (1517, 1537)
Gian Pietro Carafa (1476–1559) (1536, 1553)Elected Pope Paul IV in 1555)
Jean du Bellay (1492–1560) (1535, 1555)
François de Tournon (1489–1562) (1530, 1560)
Rodolfo Pio de Carpi (1500–1564) (1536, 1562)
Francesco Pisani (1494–1570) (1517, 1564)
Giovanni Girolamo Morone (1509–1580) (1542, 1570)
Alessandro Farnese, juniore (1520–1589) (1534, 1580)
Giovanni Antonio Serbelloni (1519–1591) (1560, 1589)
Alfonso Gesualdo (1540–1603) (1561, 1591)

17th Century
Tolomeo Gallio (1526–1607) (1565, 1603)
Domenico Pinelli (1541–1611) (1585, 1607)
Francois de Joyeuse (1562–1615) (1583, 1611)
Antonio Maria Galli (1553–1620) (1586, 1615)
Antonio Maria Sauli (1541–1623) (1587, 1620)
Francesco Maria del Monte (1549–1626) (1588, 1623)
Ottavio Bandini (1558–1629) (1596, 1626)
Giovanni Battista Deti (1576–1630) (1599, 1629)
Domenico Ginnasi (1550–1639) (1604, 1630)
Carlo Emmanuele Pio de Savoia, seniore (1585–1641) (1604, 1639)
Marcello Lante della Rovere (1561–1652) (1606, 1641)
Giulio Roma (1584–1652) (1621, 1652) served less than 5 months
Carlo de' Medici (1595–1666) (1615, 1652)
Francesco Barberini, seniore (1597–1679) (1623, 1666)
Cesare Facchinetti (1608–1683) (1643, 1680)
Niccolò Albergati-Ludovisi (1608–1687) (1645, 1683)
Alderano Cybo (1613–1700) (1645, 1687)

18th Century
Emmanuel–Theodose de la Tour d'Auvergne de Bouillon (1643–1715) (1669, 1700)
Nicola Acciaiouli (1630–1719) (1669, 1715)
Fulvio Astalli (1655–1721) (1686, 1719)
Sebastiano Antonio Tanara (1650–1724) (1695, 1721)
Francesco del Giudice (1647–1725) (1690, 1724)
Fabrizio Paolucci (1651–1726) (1697, 1725)
Francesco Pignatelli 1635 (1652–1734) (1703, 1726)
Francesco Barberini (1662–1738) (1690, 1734)
Pietro Ottoboni (1667–1740) (1689, 1738)
Tommaso Ruffo (1663–1753) (1706, 1740)
Pierluigi Carafa (1677–1755) (1728, 1753)
Rainiero d'Elci (1670–1761) (1737, 1755)
Giuseppe Spinelli (1694–1763) (1735, 1761)
Carlo Alberto Guidoboni Cavalchini (1683–1774) (1743, 1763)
Gian Francesco Albani (1720–1803) (1747, 1774) longest deanship
Henry Benedict Maria Clement Stuart (1725–1807) (1747, 1803) longest total cardinalate

19th Century
Leonardo Antonelli (1730–1811) (1775, 1807)
Alessandro Mattei (1744–1820) (1779, 1814) vacancy caused by his exile by Napoleon
Giulio Maria della Somaglia (1744–1830) (1795, 1820)
Bartolomeo Pacca (1756–1844) (1801, 1830)
Lodovico Micara (1775–1847) (1824, 1844)
Vincenzo Macchi (1770–1860) (1826, 1847)
Mario Mattei (1792–1870) (1832, 1860)
Costantino Patrizi Naro (1798–1876) (1834, 1870)
Luigi Amat di San Filippo e Sorso (1796–1878) (1837, 1877)
Camillo di Pietro (1806–1884) (1853, 1878)
Carlo Sacconi (1808–1889) (1861, 1884)
Raffaele Monaco La Valletta (1827–1896) (1868, 1889)
Luigi Oreglia di Santo Stefano (1828–1913) (1873, 1896)

20th Century
Serafino Vannutelli (1834–1915) (1887, 1913)
Vincenzo Vannutelli (1836–1930) (1889, 1915)
Gennaro Granito Pignatelli di Belmonte (1851–1948) (1911, 1930)
Francesco Marchetti-Selvaggiani (1871–1951) (1930, 1948)
Eugène Tisserant (1884–1972) (1936, 1951)
Amleto Giovanni Cicognani (1883–1973) (1958, 1972)
Luigi Traglia (1895–1977) (1960, 1974)
Carlo Confalonieri (1893–1986) (1958, 1977)
Agnelo Rossi (1913–1995) (1965, 1986, retired 1993)
Bernardin Gantin (1922–2008) (1977, 1993, retired 2002)

21st Century

References

 
 
Religious leadership roles
1